Rex Mundi is an American comic book series published by Image Comics (2003–2006) and Dark Horse Comics (2006–2009), written by Arvid Nelson and drawn by Argentinian artist Juan Ferreyra. In all, 19 issues were published by Image before the series moved to Dark Horse, where a further 19 were published before the title ended.

The series is a quest for the Holy Grail told as a murder mystery. It is set in the year 1933, in an alternate history Europe, where magic is real, feudalism persisted, and the Protestant Reformation was crushed by a still politically powerful Catholic Church. All of this is woven together as "... a meditation on the prophecies surrounding the advent of the Baháʼí era." The book takes its name from the Latin term meaning King of the World. It is derived from the Cathar heresies of the Middle Ages, and taken up in works like The Holy Blood and the Holy Grail. Within the Cathar context it seems to have been equated with the Demiurge.

Publication history 
Rex Mundi writer and co-creator Arvid Nelson came up with Rex Mundi while in Paris helping to film a documentary on The Paris Review, a literary magazine founded by Ivy League ex-pats in the 1950s

Surrounded by the juxtaposition of being in an ancient city in otherwise modern times, Nelson says he had the idea, although very vague at the time, about a story set in a place that looked modern but was actually medieval. When speaking of his plans for the story, Nelson said that it would remain primarily set in Europe, but the very end will involve a Muslim Spain.

Rex Mundi artist, Juan Ferreyra, cites photographer Eugène Atget, artist Alphonse Mucha and Coco Chanel among the many visual references for his work in Rex Mundi.

Nelson described the impact his belief in the Baháʼí Faith had on the concept:

{{Blockquote | There's also an even deeper level, allegorically, in Baháʼí faith, which in a mystical sense goes back to Abraham. ... God said to Abraham, 'I will make prophets out of your descendants. That's plural. His sons were Ishmael and Isaac, and from Isaac eventually down the years we get Jesus and the Jewish prophets. From Ishmael, eventually we get Mohammed. Baháʼí represents the reconciliation of these prophetic traditions into one unified religion. So in Rex Mundi, Julien represents Mohammed's line, Lorraine represents Christ, and Genevieve is the unity. ... [Though] it's not a direct correlation — Jesus wasn't evil.<ref name="CBR 2008-12-18">[http://www.comicbookresources.com/?page=article&id=19223 Arvid Nelson on Rex Mundi'''s final arc], Comic Book Resources, December 18, 2008</ref>}}Rex Mundi was initially published by Image Comics, starting in 2003.  In August 2006 it moved to Dark Horse. This came about after Nelson and Eric J split over creative differences. Eric J described the situation in a note to members of the Rex Mundi mailing list announcing his departure from the title:

Subsequently, Nelson sent the Image collections to Dark Horse editor Scott Allie. Dark Horse then expressed interest in taking over the publication of Rex Mundi, and Nelson described it as "an incredible opportunity that he wanted to take full advantage of".

 Related comics 
Rex Mundi devotes space in each issue to a fictitious newspaper, Le Journal de la Liberté, which enables Nelson to embellish events elsewhere in the setting without writing them entirely in his storylines, thus giving readers some useful, but not always essential, background.

The official website for Rex Mundi initially carried a spin-off comic series called Brother Matthew. Prior to the breakdown in the creative team of Nelson and Johnson, Nelson had commented that he was considering another comic series set in the same universe as Rex Mundi with different characters.The Dark Horse Book of Monsters, which was the fourth book released in a series of books under The Dark Horse Book of banner, included a Rex Mundi story by Nelson and Ferreyra called 'To Weave a Lover'.

 Collected editions Rex Mundi has been collected in the following trade paperbacks.

 Film adaptation 
There have been a number of rumours about a film version of Rex Mundi. In 2006, Jim Uhls was hired to write a script for Johnny Depp to star in and produce. It is not known how much further production has progressed since then.
Arvid Nelson confirms the rumor of the movie, and working with Johnny Depp. In December 2008, Nelson described that "the wheels of Hollywood grind slowly. ... We are at a second revision of the screenplay, so that's good. The way this works is there are periods of feverish activity, followed by lulls ... We're in one of the lulls now." An interview with MTV's Splash Page in March 2009 confirmed the film was still progressing and searching for a director.

 References 

 External links 
 
 Juan Ferreyra's blog
 Arvid Nelson's website
  (in-development)

 Interviews 
 Podcast interview with Arvid Nelson at comiXology
 Americans in Paris: An interview with EricJ and Arvid Nelson, Ninth Art, November 11, 2002
 Interview with Rex Mundi Creators Arvid Nelson & Eric J, PopImage.com, undated
 Interview: Rex Mundi Collected (part 1, part 2), PopImage.com, undated
 [http://www.comicbookresources.com/?page=article&id=19223 Arvid Nelson on Rex Mundi's final arc], Comic Book Resources, December 18, 2008

 Reviews 
 Review of Rex Mundi Book III, The Lost Kings, The Daily Cross Hatch'', March 8, 2007

Dark Horse Comics titles
Holy Grail in fiction